The 2017 Ticket Galaxy 200 was the 32nd stock car race of the 2017 NASCAR Xfinity Series season, the third and elimination race of the Round of 8, and the 19th iteration of the event. The race was held on Saturday, November 11, 2017, in Avondale, Arizona at Phoenix International Raceway, a 1-mile (1.6 km) permanent low-banked tri-oval race track. The race took the scheduled 200 laps to complete. On the final restart with 17 to go, with the help of his pit crew, William Byron, driving for JR Motorsports, would manage to pull away from the field to win his fourth and to date, final career NASCAR Xfinity Series victory, his fourth and final win of the season, and a guaranteed spot in the Championship 4. To fill out the podium, Ryan Blaney, driving for Team Penske, and Erik Jones, driving for Joe Gibbs Racing, would finish second and third, respectively.

The drivers to qualify for the Championship 4 were William Byron, Justin Allgaier, Elliott Sadler, and Daniel Hemric.

Background 

Phoenix International Raceway – also known as PIR – is a one-mile, low-banked tri-oval race track located in Avondale, Arizona. It is named after the nearby metropolitan area of Phoenix. The motorsport track opened in 1964 and currently hosts two NASCAR race weekends annually. PIR has also hosted the IndyCar Series, CART, USAC and the Rolex Sports Car Series. The raceway is currently owned and operated by International Speedway Corporation.

The raceway was originally constructed with a 2.5 mi (4.0 km) road course that ran both inside and outside of the main tri-oval. In 1991 the track was reconfigured with the current 1.51 mi (2.43 km) interior layout. PIR has an estimated grandstand seating capacity of around 67,000. Lights were installed around the track in 2004 following the addition of a second annual NASCAR race weekend.

Entry list 

 (R) denotes rookie driver.

Practice

First practice 
The first practice session was held on Friday, November 10, at 12:30 PM MST. The session would last for 55 minutes.

Second and final practice 
The final practice session, sometimes known as Happy Hour, was held on Friday, November 10, at 2:30 PM MST. The session would last for 55 minutes.

Qualifying 
Qualifying was held on Saturday, November 11, at 10:35 AM MST. Since Phoenix International Raceway is under 2 miles (3.2 km) in length, the qualifying system was a multi-car system that included three rounds. The first round was 15 minutes, where every driver would be able to set a lap within the 15 minutes. Then, the second round would consist of the fastest 24 cars in Round 1, and drivers would have 10 minutes to set a lap. Round 3 consisted of the fastest 12 drivers from Round 2, and the drivers would have 5 minutes to set a time. Whoever was fastest in Round 3 would win the pole.

No drivers would fail to qualify.

Full qualifying results

Race results 
Stage 1 Laps: 60

Stage 2 Laps: 60

Stage 3 Laps: 80

Standings after the race 

Drivers' Championship standings

Note: Only the first 12 positions are included for the driver standings.

References 

2017 NASCAR Xfinity Series
NASCAR races at Phoenix Raceway
November 2017 sports events in the United States
2017 in sports in Arizona